Penelope Kate Pratt is an Australian politician. She has been a Liberal member of the South Australian House of Assembly since the 2022 state election, representing Frome.

Pratt had previously contested two state elections. She stood for the seat of Ashford in 2010 and against the then Premier, Jay Weatherill in 2018 in the seat of Cheltenham. Prior to the 2022 election, Frome had been held since 2009 by Independent politician Geoff Brock, who stood for the seat of Stuart, following redistribution.

Pratt's father Michael was the federal member for Adelaide after winning the 1988 Adelaide by-election until he was defeated  at the 1990 federal election. Her cousin, Tom Michael, ran as the Liberal candidate for the seat of Narungga in the 2022 election.

During her election campaign, Pratt emphasised her "local" credentials, having grown up on a farm near Blyth. She worked as a Liberal staffer for Steven Marshall before he became premier, then as chief of staff for Minister for Child Protection, Rachel Sanderson. She took leave from that position in December 2021, having recently moved to the Clare Valley within the electorate. She is a member of the Liberal party's moderate faction.

References 

Living people
Members of the South Australian House of Assembly
Liberal Party of Australia members of the Parliament of South Australia
Women members of the South Australian House of Assembly
21st-century Australian politicians
Year of birth missing (living people)
21st-century Australian women politicians